is a Japanese heavy metal band formed in Tokyo in 2019. It consists of vocalist Mayu, guitarists Saki and Hazuki, bassist Haraguchi-san and drummer Tamu Murata. While independently releasing three singles between 2020 and 2021, Nemophila garnered a sizable multinational following online by uploading videos to YouTube. In June 2021, British record label JPU compiled the singles into the internationally released Oiran: Extended Edition. Nemophila released their debut studio album, Revive, in December 2021. Their most recent album, Seize the Fate, was released in December 2022.

History 
After leaving the rock band Lipstick, vocalist Mayu was looking to put together a backing band to support her at an August 22, 2019, live session. She contacted her former classmate and bassist Haraguchi-san, and the two recruited drummer Tamu Murata through magazines and website posts. Mayu was introduced to Mary's Blood guitarist Saki through a mutual friend, and Saki in turn introduced them to Disqualia guitarist Hazuki. Feeling that this line-up was too good to be a one-off, the musicians decided to form a real band. When deciding the name, Mayu said that the word "sorai" came to her and seemed refreshing, but its meaning "was difficult, so we tried to soften it." Because each member is female, Mayu wanted to use the name of a flower and searched many before they found Nemophila.

Nemophila played their first concerts on September 14 and 15 as part of Metal Weekend 2019 at Zepp Diver City, where they opened for Loudness and HammerFall. They released their first single "Oiran" on February 29, 2020, and held their first one-man live that same day to a sold-out audience at Shibuya Rex. Due to Murata being on maternity leave, they were supported by Show-Ya drummer Miki "Mittan" Tsunoda. "Raitei", their second single, was released on August 22, 2020, the same day that Murata returned to live activities after giving birth in May. On November 14, Nemophila and Gacharic Spin livestreamed a concert led by Show-Ya frontwoman Keiko Terada.

Their third single "Dissension" followed on February 28, 2021. On April 29, the band performed at Show-Ya's all-female Naon no Yaon festival. On June 22, 2021, Kai of Esprit D'Air selected Nemophila as one of his top ten favorite rock and metal bands from Japan. Nemophila released their international compilation Oiran: Extended Edition from British label JPU Records on June 25. Compiling the band's entire discography up to that point, plus a new English version of "Dissension", it was the most pre-ordered album in the label's history. It also marked the first time the band's music had ever been available in record shops, as previously everything was sold directly from their website in Japan.

Nemophila released their debut studio album Revive on December 15, 2021. Their first one-man concert with all five members at Line Cube Shibuya was performed on January 9, 2022 and the tickets sold out quickly after going on sale in October 2021. The video album Nemophila Live 2022 Revive ~It's Sooooo Nice to Finally Meet You!!!!!~ featuring the live performance on that day was released on May 11, 2022. For each date of their first tour, which took place at various Zepp venues throughout June, Nemophila was joined by one of the following acts; Mucc, Passcode, Loudness, Kishidan, or Rottengraffty. They released Revive U.S. Version, which includes the songs from their first studio album re-recorded in English, on June 21. On July 1, Nemophila played their first international concert in the United States at the Whisky a Go Go in West Hollywood, California. They also performed at Aftershock Festival in Sacramento, California on October 7.

Musical style and songwriting 
Saki said the most important thing in Nemophila is to play "hard music like metalcore, but make it 'yurufuwa', to give it more of a personality. A Japanese word, it means... fluffy and smooth." She elaborated in another interview, "Traditionally, rock bands have a strong, masculine image. The concept of 'yurufuwa' is to stay close to ourselves rather than forcibly portraying our female identity as masculine. We thought it was interesting to make the cuteness of something fluffy come together with intense metal parts. You can feel it in the choruses of 'Dissension' and 'Raitei', but also in our behavior on stage." Hazuki has cited the various ways in which Mayu sings as an important feature of Nemophila; "Her raw voice is very characteristic. That is why we were aiming for a heavier sound."

According to Saki, when the band first formed they started composing songs that combined "some little Japanese things, like in 'Oiran', some electronic elements and Japanese rock with lots of melodic elements." Although Saki composes some songs, Nemophila has a composer team that works behind the scenes and gives the members the MIDI data. Hazuki said they always welcome input from composer/producer Kensuke Akiyama; "he tells us when a phrase is cool, or when we should try something different. He suggests in a song where Mayu should use a shout voice or where a phrase to go along with a shout might fit best." Saki described the process as not all that different from when the band writes their own songs; "After the songs are finished, we discuss the image the song has to convey with mister Akiyama and each other. Then we add our own ideas to the demos and that will be the foundation of the song."

Mayu cites Dave Grohl as an influence and utilizes both clean and screamed vocals. Although stating that the former is more challenging for her, she said switching between the two is even more difficult. Mayu writes many of the lyrics, but the vocal melodies are primarily written by Akiyama and Saki, who take her suggestions into consideration. The singer writes lyrics in both Japanese and English, which is determined by the song's melody; "If the melody has a relatively small number of sounds, I'm more tempted to write English lyrics. And when I have something to say based on what I hear, I write them in Japanese. But of course, it has to be pleasant to sing. And if that's in English, I'll sometimes change it flexibly to make it sound cool." Mayu also said that the lyrics are generally quite positive, which she cited as something that makes Nemophila unique.

In general, Saki said she plays her guitar with a slightly lower sound than fellow guitarist Hazuki. They each create their own guitar solos, and Murata always creates her own drum fills. Haraguchi-san alternates between fingerpicking and using guitar picks, but slightly prefers the former due to its thicker sound.

Members 
Mayu – vocals (2019–present)
Saki – guitar, backing vocals (2019–present)
 – guitar, backing vocals (2019–present)
 – bass guitar, backing vocals (2019–present)
 – drums (2019–present)

Discography

Studio albums

Compilations

Video albums

Singles

Digital singles

Music videos

See also 
List of J-pop concerts held outside Asia

References

External links 
 
  at JPU Records 

Japanese heavy metal musical groups
Musical groups established in 2019
Musical groups from Tokyo
2019 establishments in Japan
All-female bands
Musical quintets
Heavy metal supergroups
Women in metal